Araracuara Airport  is an airport serving Araracuara, in the Caquetá Department of Colombia. Araracuara was the site of a former penal colony for Colombia's worst and most dangerous criminals.

The town and airport are on the north bank of the Caquetá River, an eventual tributary of the Amazon River.

The Araracuara non-directional beacon (Ident: ARA) is located just south of the airport.

Airlines and destinations

Accidents and incidents
On 6 September 2014, ten people were killed when a twin-engine Piper PA-31 Navajo aircraft, a small passenger plane belonging to the Laser company, crashed in the Amazon rainforest near Puerto Santander after taking off from Araracuara Airport. Among those killed were two researchers from the Alexander von Humboldt Biological Resources Research Institute. There were no survivors.

See also
Transport in Colombia
List of airports in Colombia

References

External links
OpenStreetMap - Araracuara
OurAirports - Araracuara Airport
SkyVector - Araracuara
Google Maps - Araracuara

Airports in Colombia